The Treaty of Whampoa was a commercial treaty between Qing dynasty of China and Kingdom of France, which was signed by Qiying and Théodore de Lagrené on October 24, 1844 aboard the warship L’Archimède. It is considered an unequal treaty by many sources.

Terms
China was to grant the same privileges to the Kingdom of France as to Britain in the Treaty of Nanking and subsequent treaties. The privileges included the opening of five harbours to French merchants, extraterritorial privileges French citizens in China, a fixed tariff on Sino-French trade and the right of France to station consuls in China.

Toleration of Christianity
Although French Prime Minister François Guizot had given Lagrené only a mandate to negotiate a commercial treaty with France, Lagrené decided that he wanted to enhance France's international prestige by securing a rescission of Yongzheng Emperor's prohibition of Christianity in China from 1724. France could thus become the protectorate of Catholics in China, like France in the Levant. After protracted negotiations with Qiying, most of which Lagrené entrusted to his interpreter Joseph-Marie Callery, the Daoguang Emperor issued an edict in February 1846 that legalized the practice of Christianity in China.

See also
 Imperialism in Asia
 Convention of Peking

References
Cady, John Frank. The Roots of French Imperialism in Eastern Asia. Ithaca, N.Y.: Cornell University Press, 1967.
Grosse-Aschhoff, Angelus Francis J. The Negotiations between Ch'i-Ying and Lagrené, 1844-1846. St. Bonaventure, New York: Franciscan Institute, 1950.

Whampoa
1844 in France
1844 in China
1844 treaties
Whampoa